Kifisias railway station is a station located on Kifisias Avenue in Marousi, a northern suburb of Athens, Greece, located in the median strip of the Attiki Odos motorway. It was first opened on 30 July 2004, along with the first section of the Athens Airport–Patras railway, and is located in the median strip of Motorway 6, at the interchange of Kifisias Avenue, from which the station is named. The station consists of an island platform and a train storage line. In the future, it will meet with Metro Line 4, through Paradise Station, which is planned to open after 2035.

The station should not be confused with the metro station of Line 1, which lies further north in the suburb of Kifisia.

History
The station opened on 30 July 2004, along with the first section of the Athens Airport–Patras railway. In 2009, with the Greek debt crisis unfolding OSE's Management was forced to reduce services across the network. Timetables were cut back, and routes closed as the government-run entity attempted to reduce overheads. Services from Athens Airport & Athens were cut back, with some ticket offices closing, reducing the reliability of services and passenger numbers. In 2017 OSE's passenger transport sector was privatised as TrainOSE, currently, a wholly owned subsidiary of Ferrovie dello Stato Italiane infrastructure, including stations, remained under the control of OSE.

Facilities
The station has a ticket office and cafe (since closed). At platform level, the station is equipped with Dot-matrix display departure and arrival screens on the platforms for passenger information, seating, and information boards, with access to the platforms via life or escalator. Outside the station, there a limited number of parking spaces for railway users.

Services

Since 15 May 2022, the following weekday services call at this station:

Future
The Athens Metro Development Plan of October 2022 currently proposes an interchange from this station with Line 4, at Paradissos.

Station layout

References

2004 establishments in Greece
Buildings and structures in North Athens
Marousi
Railway stations in Attica
Railway stations in highway medians
Railway stations opened in 2004
Transport in North Athens